The IX Reserve Corps was a corps level command of the German Army in World War I.

Formation 
IX Reserve Corps was formed on the outbreak of the war in August 1914 as part of the mobilisation of the Army. It was initially commanded by General der Infanterie Max von Boehn, brought out of retirement. It was still in existence at the end of the war in the 5th Army, Heeresgruppe Gallwitz on the Western Front.

Structure on formation 
On formation in August 1914, IX Reserve Corps consisted of two divisions, made up of reserve units. In general, Reserve Corps and Reserve Divisions were weaker than their active counterparts
Reserve Infantry Regiments did not always have three battalions nor necessarily contain a machine gun company
Reserve Jäger Battalions did not have a machine gun company on formation
Reserve Cavalry Regiments consisted of just three squadrons
Reserve Field Artillery Regiments usually consisted of two abteilungen of three batteries each
Corps Troops generally consisted of a Telephone Detachment and four sections of munition columns and trains 

The IX Reserve Corps was exceptional as it formed the major part of the North Army so was provided with more Corps Troops than other Reserve Corps: a Foot Artillery Battalion, a Pioneer Regiment and a Field Airship Detachment.

In summary, IX Reserve Corps mobilised with 25 infantry battalions, 5 machine gun companies (30 machine guns), 6 cavalry squadrons, 12 field artillery batteries (72 guns), 4 heavy batteries (16 guns), a Field Airship Detachment and 7 pioneer companies. 17th Reserve Division was slightly stronger than the norm as it included an active infantry brigade.

Combat chronicle 
On mobilisation, IX Reserve Corps was assigned to the North Army, which was held back in Schleswig to defend the German North Sea Coast in case of British landings. It was soon transferred to the Western Front, joining 1st Army in late August.

Commanders 
IX Reserve Corps had the following commanders during its existence:

See also 

German Army order of battle (1914)
German Army order of battle, Western Front (1918)

References

Bibliography 
 
 
 
 
 
 

Corps of Germany in World War I
Military units and formations established in 1914
Military units and formations disestablished in 1918